Aldair Amarildo Fuentes Siguas (born 25 January 1998) is a Peruvian footballer who plays as a defensive midfielder for Alianza Lima, on loan from Spanish club CF Fuenlabrada.

Club career

Alianza Lima
Born in Pisco, Fuentes joined Alianza Lima's youth setup in 2014. Promoted to the first team for the 2017 campaign, he made his professional debut on 13 February of that year, starting in a 2–0 home win against Universitario de Deportes.

Fuentes scored his first professional goal on 19 February 2017, netting his team's first in a 2–2 home draw against Deportivo Municipal. He subsequently established himself as a starter for the club, playing 38 matches and scoring four times in his first professional season.

Fuenlabrada
On 4 September 2020, Fuentes moved abroad for the first time in his career, signing a five-year deal with Spanish Segunda División side CF Fuenlabrada. He made his debut for the club on 26 September, playing the last 19 minutes of a 1–0 home win over Albacete Balompié.

Return to Alianza Lima (loan)
On 27 January 2022, Fuentes returned to his former side Alianza Lima on loan.

Personal life
Fuentes' brother Jean Pierre is also a footballer and a midfielder. Their father Isidro also played professionally, but was a forward.

References

External links

1998 births
Living people
People from Pisco, Peru
Peruvian footballers
Association football midfielders
Peruvian Primera División players
Club Alianza Lima footballers
Segunda División players
CF Fuenlabrada footballers
Peru youth international footballers
Peru under-20 international footballers
Peruvian expatriate footballers
Peruvian expatriate sportspeople in Spain
Expatriate footballers in Spain